The Musi River may refer to: 

Musi River (India), a tributary of the Krishna River in Andhra Pradesh
Moosy River, also known as the Musi River, Telangana, India
Musi River (Indonesia)

See also 
 Musi (disambiguation)